= Lola de la Mata =

English sound artist and musician

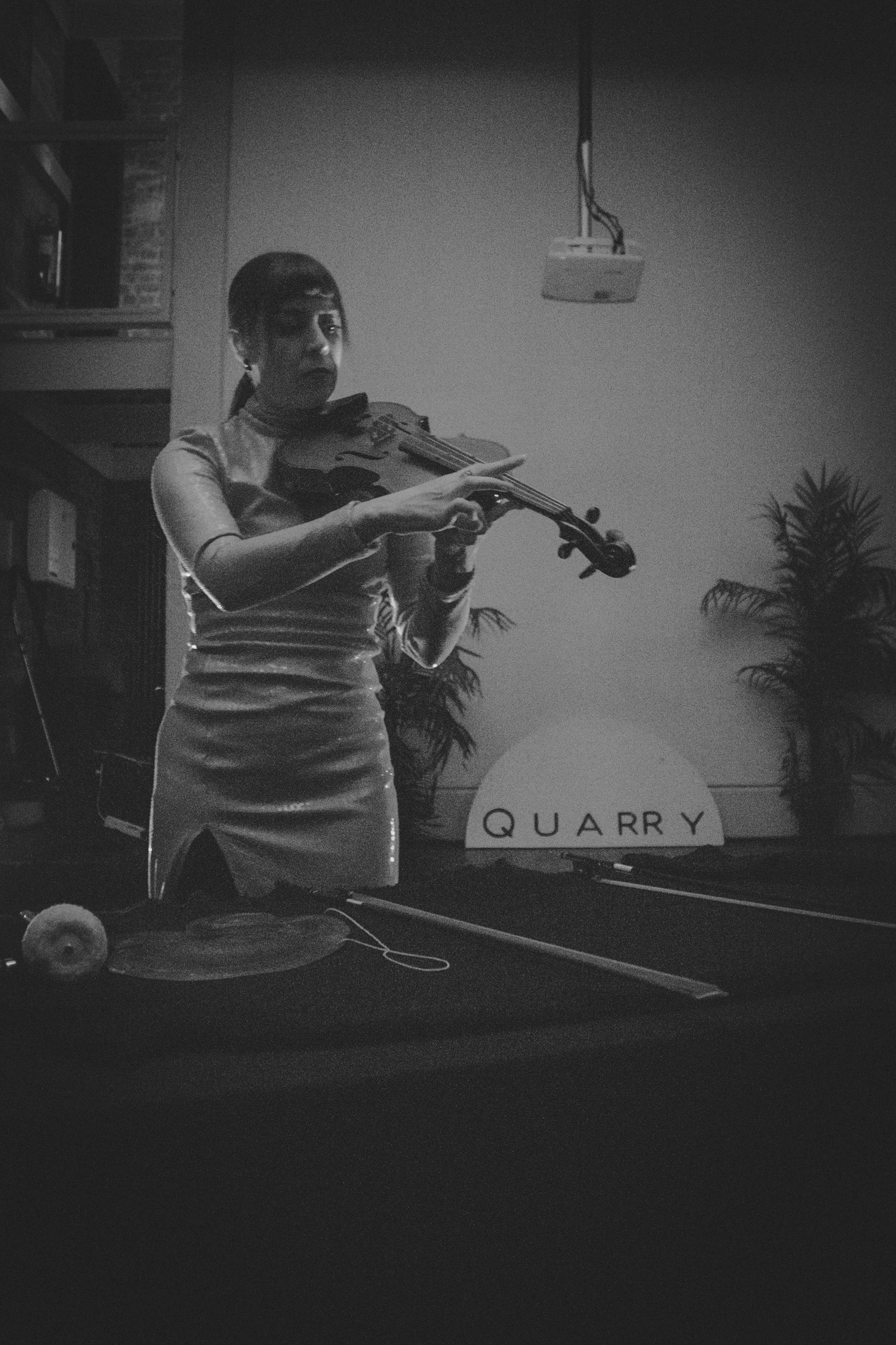
- Lola de la Mata performing in Liverpool, 2025

Background information
- Born: 1991 (age 33–34); London, England
- Occupation(s): Composer, sound artist, curator
- Years active: 1977–present
- Website: www.loladelamata.com

Lola de la Mata (born 1991) is a London-born, French/Spanish composer, sound artist and curator currently based in Liverpool.

== Awards and honours ==
She was one of the winners of the 2024 Oram Awards.
